Boskovice is a town in Blansko District in the South Moravian Region of the Czech Republic. It has about 12,000 inhabitants. The area of the historic town centre, Jewish quarter, château complex and castle ruin is well preserved and is protected by law as an urban monument zone.

Administrative parts
Villages of Bačov, Hrádkov, Mladkov and Vratíkov are administrative parts of Boskovice.

Geography

It lies on the border of the Boskovice Furrow and Drahany Highlands. The Boskovice Reservoir is largely located in the municipal territory. The reservoir lies on the river Bělá which flows through the eastern part of the town and the southern part of the territory.

History

Boskovice was probably founded in the 13th century as a market village. The first written mention of Boskovice is from 1222, when the lord Jimram of Boskovice was listed as a witness in a deed of the King Ottokar I of Bohemia. The Boskovice Castle was first mentioned in 1313.

During the reign of Maria Theresa (1740–1780), Boskovice was promoted to a town.

Boskovice used to have one of the largest Jewish communities in Moravia. The first mention of Jews in Boskovice is from 1343. After 1454, many Jews expelled from Brno came to Boskovice. In the first half of the 16th century, the Jewish community was established. A closed ghetto separated from the town with two gates was established in 1727. After 1848, The Jewish community of Boskovice has become a politically independent town with its own mayor. At its peak in 1857, more than 1,800 Jews lived here.

Until 1918, Boskowitz – Boskovice was part of the Austrian monarchy (Austria side after the compromise of 1867), head of the district with the same name, one of the 34 Bezirkshauptmannschaften in Moravia.

In 1918, Boskovice became part of independent Czechoslovakia. The period of German occupation lasted from March 1939 until May 1945. During this time, Boskovice was administered as a part of the Protectorate of Bohemia and Moravia.

From 1848 until 1960, Boskovice was a district town. Since 1960, it has been part of the Blansko District.

Demographics

Economy
Boskovice is known for the Minerva Boskovice company, manufacturer of sewing machines. It was founded in 1881. In 1997, the German company Dürkopp Adler became the majority shareholder.

Transport
Boskovice is located on the Velké Opatovice – Skalice nad Svitavou railway of local importance.

Culture

Since 1993, the town has hosted the Boskovice Festival, subtitled Festival for the Jewish Quarter. It is a music festival that aims to draw the public's attention to the existence of this monument and to help save it.

From 2001 to 2010, the town hosted the largest festival of dance music in Moravia, Hradhouse Festival.

Sights

There is 79 preserved houses of Baroque and Neoclassical origin and one of the original gates. The Baroque synagogue was built in 1639 and later modified in Empire and neo-Gothic styles. It contains an exhibition on the history and monuments of the local Jewish community. The Jewish cemetery was founded not later than in the 16th century. The oldest preserved readable tomb is from 1670.

The Gothic castle in Boskovice was founded in the 13th century. In the mid-16th century, it was reconstructed in the Renaissance style. In the early 18th century, several outbuildings were added, but it was soon abandoned, and in the  1830s the castle was dismantled for the construction of buildings in the town. The torso of the castle palace has been preserved from the large building.

The Boskovice Château was originally a Dominican monastery, rebuilt in 1819–1826 into an Empire style residence. It is surrounded by an English park. The château complex includes a large Neoclassical greenhouse from 1826–1829, a unique building of its type, and a neo-Gothic riding hall.

The nearby manor residence was built in 1729–1733 as the seat of the Dietrichstein family. It served its purpose until the family had the château built. After 1826, it served as an administrative building of the manor. Today this simple Baroque building houses the Boskovice Region Museum. Next to the manor residence is the original manor house. It was built in the 17th century as a complex of farm buildings.

The Church of Saint James the Great on the town square is from 1346. It was rebuilt in 1493–1527 and repaired many times, however, several parts of the original structure are preserved. The second landmark of the square is the town hall. Its current form is from the late Renaissance reconstruction in 1567.

Notable people

Moses Sofer (1762–1839), one of the leading Orthodox rabbis of European Jewry
Hirsch Bär Fassel (1802–1883), rabbi and philosopher
Hermann Wassertrilling (18??–1887), Austrian Hebraist
Solomon H. Sonneschein (1839–1908), Hungarian-American rabbi
Karel Absolon (1877–1960), archaeologist, paleontologist and speleologist
Otakar Kubín (1883–1969), painter and sculptor
Hermann Ungar (1893–1929), writer
Josef Augusta (1903–1968), paleontologist and geologist
Tomáš Špidlík (1919–2010), prelate of the Catholic Church
Josef Koudelka (born 1938), photographer
Pavel Kysilka (born 1958), economist
Ladislav Maier (born 1966), footballer
Yvetta Hlaváčová (born 1975), long-distance swimmer

Twin towns – sister cities

Boskovice is twinned with:
 Frasnes-lez-Anvaing, Belgium
 Levice, Slovakia
 Prnjavor, Bosnia and Herzegovina
 Rawa Mazowiecka, Poland

Gallery

References

External links

 
Boskovice Castle
Boskovice Château

Populated places in Blansko District
Cities and towns in the Czech Republic
Shtetls
Castles in the South Moravian Region
Margraviate of Moravia